Freep may refer to: 

 Detroit Free Press, a daily newspaper published in Detroit, Michigan
 Los Angeles Free Press, an Alternative newspaper started in May 1964. This publication is often cited as the first of the alternative newspapers of this type.
 Daily Free Press, Boston University's independent student newspaper
 Free Republic, a U.S. Internet community for conservative activists
 Fearless Freep, an off-stage character from a Warner Bros. cartoon